United Nations Security Council Resolution 20, adopted unanimously on 10 March 1947, reviewed the first report of the Atomic Energy Commission, urged the AEC to continue its inquiry into the international control of Atomic Energy and asked it to present a second report before the next session of the General Assembly.

See also
 List of United Nations Security Council Resolutions 1 to 100 (1946–1953)

References
Text of the Resolution at undocs.org

External links
 

 0020
 0020
March 1947 events